The London Borough of Newham  is a London borough created in 1965 by the London Government Act 1963. It covers an area previously administered by the Essex county boroughs of West Ham and East Ham, authorities that were both abolished by the same act. The name Newham reflects its creation and combines the compass points of the old borough names. Situated in the East London part of Inner London, Newham has a population of 387,576, which is the third highest of the London boroughs and also makes it the 17th most populous district in England. The local authority is Newham London Borough Council.

Newham was one of the six host boroughs for the 2012 Summer Olympics and contains most of the Olympic Park including the London Stadium, and also contains the London City Airport. Major districts include East Ham, West Ham, Stratford, Plaistow, Forest Gate, Beckton and Canning Town.

History
The borough was formed on 1 April 1965 under the London Government Act 1963, as a borough of the newly formed Greater London. It broadly covered the areas of the county borough of East Ham and the county borough of West Ham that were abolished by the same act.
These in turn were successors to the ancient civil and ecclesiastical parishes of East Ham and West Ham. Green Street and Boundary Road mark the former boundary between the two. North Woolwich also became part of the borough (previously being part of the Metropolitan Borough of Woolwich, south of the river Thames in the County of London) along with a small area west of the River Roding which had previously been part of the Municipal Borough of Barking. Newham was devised for the borough as an entirely new name.

Manor of Ham
The area of the modern borough was at one time occupied by a manor (an estate or landholding with certain legal responsibilities) called 'Ham'. The name comes from Old English 'hamm' and means 'a dry area of land between rivers or marshland', referring to the location of the settlement within boundaries formed by the rivers Lea, Thames and Roding and their marshes.

The first known written use of the term, as 'Hamme', is in an Anglo-Saxon charter of 958, in which King Edgar granted the area to Ealdorman Athelstan. The territory was undivided at that time. A subsequent charter of 1037 describes a transfer of land which has been identified with East Ham, indicating that the division of the territory occurred between 958 and 1037.

The Domesday Book shows landholdings divided further, and by the end of the 12th century these manors were being served, singly or in groups of manors, by the familiar ancient parishes of West Ham, East Ham and Little Ilford (now also known as Manor Park), with some areas by the Roding a part of Barking, and the area now known as North Woolwich attached to Woolwich. The earliest recorded use of the name West Ham, Westhamma, comes in 1186, and East Ham, Estham, is recorded in 1204.

The boundary between West and East Ham was drawn from the now lost Hamfrith Waste and Hamfrith Wood in the north (then the southernmost parts of Epping Forest which extended as far south as the Romford Road at that time), along Green Street down to the small, also lost, natural harbour known as Ham Creek. Ham Creek was filled-in in the nineteenth century, but the small residual head of the creek still formed the boundary between the two areas into the late 20th century, when what remained was also filled in.

The formation of the modern borough in 1965 saw the merger of West and East Ham, together with North Woolwich and Barking west of the River Roding. Little Ilford had become part of East Ham as part of earlier local government reorganisations.

Medieval period
The prosperity of the area increased due to the construction of Bow Bridge, the only bridge over the Lea, and the creation of Stratford Langthorne Abbey.

Governance

Unlike most English districts, its council is led by a directly elected mayor of Newham.  From 2002 to 2009 one of the councillors had been appointed as the "civic ambassador" and performed the civic and ceremonial role previously carried out by the mayor.  The post has been discontinued.

At the borough elections held in 2014, the Labour Party won all 60 of the seats on the council. Sir Robin Wales was re-elected as the borough's Executive Mayor with 61% of the first preference votes cast.

In 2018, Robin Wales was deselected as the Labour Party mayoral candidate. Rokhsana Fiaz was elected in the position of Executive Mayor, also for the Labour party.

Coat of arms
The borough adopted West Ham's coat of arms, but with a motto adapted from that of East Ham.

The arms include the following elements:
 The crosier signified the Cistercian Stratford Langthorne Abbey.
 The sword and the red and yellow chevronells are taken from the arms of William de Montfitchet, a major local landowner and founder of the abbey.
 The crossed hammers represent the Thames Ironworks and Shipbuilding Company, once a major local employer.
 The ship in full sail represents the maritime trades and the area's links to the sea.
 The arms also include a sun rising in the east.

The borough's motto, "Progress with the People" is an English translation of East Ham's Latin "Progressio cum Populo".

Demography

Population figures

Newham has, after Barnet and Croydon, the third highest population of the London boroughs, with a population numbering 382,984 as of 2021. Despite growing since the 1980s, it is still drastically lower than its pre-war peak. In the period between 1951 and 1981, Newham's population shrunk by 28.87% owing to factors such as the war bombings and the increasingly high unemployment. The redevelopment of the Docklands as well as development related to the 2012 Olympics have contributed to reversing its declining trend.

Ethnicities

Newham has the youngest overall population and one of the lowest White British populations in the country according to the 2011 UK Census. The borough has the second-highest percentage of Muslims in the UK, after the neighbouring London Borough of Tower Hamlets, at 32%. A 2017 report from Trust for London and the New Policy Institute found that 36% of local employees in Newham are in low paid work; the highest percentage of any London borough. Newham also has a 37% poverty rate, which is the second-highest rate in London.

Newham is very ethnically diverse. When using Simpson's Diversity Index on 10 aggregated ethnic groups, the 2001 UK Census identified Newham as the most ethnically diverse district in England and Wales, with 9 wards in the top 15. However, when using the 16 ethnic categories in the Census so that White Irish and White Other ethnic minorities are also included in the analysis, Newham becomes the second-most ethnically diverse borough with six out of the top 15 wards, behind Brent with 7 out of the top 15 wards.

Newham has the lowest percentage of White British residents of all of London's boroughs. The White British proportion of the population fell from 33.8% in 2001 to 16.7% in 2011 and then to 13.4% in 2021; this decrease of 37.5 percentage points is the largest of any local authority in England and Wales between the two censuses. The joint-lowest wards with White British population are Green Street East and Green Street West, both having 4.8% – the third-lowest behind Southall Broadway and Southall Green in Ealing. East Ham North follows closely, at 4.9%.

People of White British ethnicity nevertheless remain the largest single group in the borough. The largest non-White British ethnic groups are Indian (15%), African (14%), Bangladeshi (12%) and Pakistani (11%). Newham has had a large Asian community for many decades; more than half of Newham's Upton and Kensington wards were of ethnic minority origin in 1981. The nationality to increase the most in number since 1991 is the Bangladeshi community. Newham has the largest total population of Asian origin in London; it is notably a borough with high populations of all three largest British Asian nationalities: Indian, Pakistani and Bangladeshi - Newham has the 5th highest Indian population in London and the 2nd highest each for both Pakistani and Bangladeshi.

Newham has 1,340 residents who were born in Ukraine, the highest population of Ukrainians in the UK.

Health 
In 2018, Newham had the lowest life expectancy and the highest rate of heart disease of all London boroughs together with the London Borough of Tower Hamlets.

In 2019, the BBC reported that Newham had the highest rate of tuberculosis in the UK at 107 per  population, which was higher than Rwanda (69) and Iraq (45) according to WHO figures from 2013. More than 80% of TB cases in London occur in people born abroad. The UK average was 13.

Religion

The following table shows the religious identity of residents residing in Newham according to the 2001, 2011 and the 2021 censuses.

Education

A 2017 report by Trust for London and the New Policy Institute finds that the GCSE attainment gap between advantaged and disadvantaged pupils in Newham is the 4th best out of 32 London boroughs.

Schools and colleges

The Borough is the education authority for the district providing education in a mix of Foundation, community and voluntary aided schools. The borough also owns and operates Debden House, a residential adult education college in Loughton, Essex, and is home to the Rosetta Art Centre, a dedicated visual art organisation which delivers courses at its base in Stratford and produces participatory art projects, programmes and initiatives. The Essex Primary School in Sheridan Road with over 900 pupils is one of the biggest primary schools in London.

University
The University of East London has two campuses in Newham:
the Stratford Campus, at Stratford
the Docklands Campus, next to the regenerated Royal Albert Dock

Birkbeck Stratford is a collaboration between Birkbeck, University of London and UEL to increase participation in adult learning. This is based on the UEL/Birkbeck shared campus, USS (University Square Stratford), in the centre of Stratford.

The University of East London had formed a partnership with the United States Olympic Committee which resulted in the United States Olympic Team using University of East London campuses as training bases during the London 2012 Olympic and Paralympic Games.

Places of interest

Community
 The Hub, a community resource centre built by the local community, in Star Lane, E16, featuring up to the minute "green" features
 Grassroots, another innovative green resource centre built by the community. Grassroots is in Memorial Recreation Ground, E15
 Rosetta Art Centre, situated in walking distance to Grassroots, also in E15

Libraries
Newham has ten libraries (Beckton, Canning Town, Custom House, East Ham, Green Street, Manor Park, North Woolwich, Plaistow, Stratford and Forest Gate).

Museums
 North Woolwich Old Station Museum. Closed in 2008.
 Three Mills, a mill complex on the east bank of the River Lea. A trading site for nearly a thousand years, the House Mill was built in 1776 and was (and remains) the country's largest tide mill. It has been restored and contains much of its original machinery including four large waterwheels, millstones and grain chutes.

Markets
There are a number of local markets in the Borough, including Queens Market, which the council was controversially seeking to redevelop.  The proposal was successfully opposed by Friends of Queens Market.

Parks and open spaces

80 hectares within the borough are designated as part of the Metropolitan Green Belt.

Performance

 Stratford Circus Arts Centre , a community arts venue which presents theatre, dance, music, circus and comedy from around the world for communities in Newham and East London. The organisation works with schools and local groups in Newham to provide classes, workshops and outreach opportunities. Stratford Circus Arts Centre partners with Newham Council for Every Child a Theatre Goer  which invites every year 6 child to a performance at the venue
 Theatre Royal Stratford East
 St Mark's Church, Silvertown The church was designed by Samuel Saunders Teulon. It was built between 1861 and 1862 after a cholera epidemic swept the district and local clergy appealed through the columns of The Times for funds to provide an architectural, as well as spiritual, beacon for the area. It is now the home of the Brick Lane Music Hall.

Shopping and exhibitions
 Queen's Market – an historic street market 
 ICC London – ExCeL – International Conference Centre
 Gallions Reach Shopping Park
 East Shopping Centre – Europe's first purpose-built boutique Asian shopping centre
 Green Street – a shopping street mostly catering for the Asian community
 Stratford Centre
 Westfield Shopping Centre, Stratford – The largest Westfield Shopping Centre in Europe.

Sport
 Newham was one of the six host boroughs for the 2012 Summer Olympics
 West Ham United F.C. play its home matches at the London Stadium (formerly the Olympic Stadium) in Stratford
 The Newham and Essex Beagles Athletics Club has its headquarters at the London Marathon Community Track in Queen Elizabeth Olympic Park adjacent to the London Stadium.
 Clapton F.C., a non-league football club, plays at the Terence McMillan Stadium in Plaistow
 Athletic Newham F.C., a non-league football club, plays at the Terence McMillan Stadium in Plaistow
 London APSA F.C., a non-league football club, plays at the Flanders Playing Fields in Napier Road, East Ham
 London Regatta Centre, a charitable organisation promoting water sports such as rowing and dragon boats, is in Beckton

Newspapers
The local newspaper is the Newham Recorder.

Districts
See List of districts in the London Borough of Newham for the full list, including neighbourhoods or localities which form part of the areas listed below.

 Beckton
 Canning Town
 Custom House
 East Ham
 Forest Gate
 Manor Park
 North Woolwich 
 Plaistow  
 Silvertown
 Stratford
 Upton Park
 West Ham

Parishes
The borough is covered by the following ecclesiastical parishes of the Church of England:

Parish of the Divine Compassion, Plaistow and North Canning Town
St Martin's Church, Plaistow
St Mary's Church, Plaistow
St Philip and St James Church, Plaistow
St Matthias' Church, Canning Town
St Luke's Church, Canning Town
Church of the Ascension, Victoria Docks
St John's Church, North Woolwich
St Mark's Church, Beckton
Parish of East Ham, Holy Trinity
St Bartholomew's Church, East Ham
St Mary Magdalene's Church, East Ham
St Alban's Church, Upton Park
St Edmund's Church, Forest Gate
St George's and St Ethelbert's Church, East Ham
St Paul's Church, East Ham
Little Ilford
St Mary's Church, Little Ilford
St Michael's Church, Romford Road
St Barnabas, Little Ilford
Emmanuel Forest Gate, with St Peter's, Upton Cross
St Mark's Church, Forest Gate
St Saviour and St James, Forest Gate
St Margaret with St Columba, Leytonstone
St Paul and St James, Stratford
St John with Christchurch, Stratford
All Saints Church, West Ham

Transport
Since the 1980s, public transport in Newham has undergone many upgrades and improvements are still continuing to this day. The Jubilee Line Extension was completed in 1999, including new or improved stations at Canning Town, West Ham and Stratford. The Docklands Light Railway opened in 1987 and has undergone many extensions since, predominantly serving Newham and neighbouring Tower Hamlets. The DLR network compensates for Newham's lack of tube stations, of which there are only 6, in comparison with other London boroughs. It was extended to serve London City Airport, as well as Stratford International station in 2011 after its High Speed 1 link opened in late 2009. The Crossrail scheme will also improve rail connections to several stations as it heads through the borough on an east west axis. As a result of all the recent developments, the borough contains one of only two airports located within the Greater London boundary and currently the only railway station outside of central London that is served by high speed rail.

List of stations

Abbey Road DLR station
Beckton DLR station
Beckton Park DLR station
Cyprus DLR station
Canning Town station – Jubilee line and DLR
Custom House station - Elizabeth line and DLR
East Ham tube station – District and Hammersmith & City lines
Forest Gate railway station – Elizabeth line
Gallions Reach DLR station
King George V DLR station
London City Airport DLR station
Manor Park railway station – Elizabeth line
Maryland railway station – Elizabeth line
Plaistow tube station – District and Hammersmith & City lines
Pontoon Dock DLR station
Prince Regent DLR station
Royal Albert DLR station
Royal Victoria DLR station
Star Lane DLR station
Stratford station – Abellio Greater Anglia, c2c, Elizabeth line, Jubilee and Central lines, London Overground and DLR
Stratford High Street DLR station
Stratford International station – Southeastern, DLR
Pudding Mill Lane DLR station
Upton Park tube station – District and Hammersmith & City lines
Wanstead Park railway station – London Overground
West Ham station – c2c, Jubilee, District and Hammersmith & City lines, and DLR
West Silvertown DLR station
Woodgrange Park railway station – London Overground

Travel to work
In March 2011, the main forms of transport that residents used to travel to work were: underground, metro, light rail, tram, 23.0% of all residents aged 16–74; driving a car or van, 7.6%; bus, minibus or coach, 7.6%; train, 7.2%; on foot, 4.1%; work mainly at or from home, 1.4%; bicycle, 1.0%.

River services
 Woolwich Ferry

Cable car
 London Cable Car

International services
 Dutchflyer rail-sea service via Stratford station to the Netherlands
 London City Airport
 Stratford International station (No Eurostar trains stop)

Bus routes
London Buses routes 5, 25, 58, 69, 86, 97, 101, 104, 108, 115, 147, 158, 173, 238, 241, 257, 262, 276, 300, 304, 308, 309, 323, 325, 330, 339, 366, 376, 388, 425, 473, 474, 541, D8, W19, School buses routes 673, 678 and Night route N8, N15, N86, N205, N550 and N551 all serve the London Borough of Newham with main interchanges at Stratford, Stratford City and Beckton bus stations, with large bus interchanges also available at East Ham and Upton Park.

Town twinning

Newham is twinned with:
 Kaiserslautern, Germany

Freedom of the Borough
The following people and military units have received the Freedom of the Borough of Newham.

Individuals
 Sir Jack Petchey :  27 May 2010.
 Mark Noble: 15 December 2016.

Military Units
 G Company 7th Battalion The Rifles: 23 June 2012.

Notable people

See also

List of districts in the London Borough of Newham
List of schools in Newham
Newham parks and open spaces
Newham Sixth Form College
Newham College of Further Education
Stratford Circus
Stratford, London
Stratford City
Thames Gateway
Rising East

References and notes

External links

 Newham London Borough Council
 Mayor of Newham
 NIMS –  Statistics on Newham
 Newham Issues Forum  – online local discussions
 Aston-Mansfield- charity started in 1884
 Community Links – innovative charity running community-based projects
 Newham Labour Party – website of the Labour Party in Newham
 Rising East: the journal of East London studies
 Newham Story  – memories of Newham
 Local guide to Stratford, Newham
 Newham New Deal Partnership
 Newham Yaplondon Group- Local chat and discussions
 It's a Newham Thing – It's a Newham Thing

 
London boroughs
Local authorities adjoining the River Thames
1965 establishments in the United Kingdom
Pakistani-British culture in London